The river carpsucker (Carpiodes carpio) is a freshwater fish found in the inland United States and northern Mexico. This species has a slightly arched back and is somewhat stout and compressed. While the fins are usually opaque, in older fish they may be dark yellow. It is distributed along the Mississippi River basin from Pennsylvania to Montana. The river carpsucker, like most suckers, is a bottom feeder and obtains its nutrients from algae, microcrustaceans, and other various tiny planktonic plants and animals found in silty substrates. Like its congener, the quillback, the river carpsucker is long-lived, with a lifespan of more than 45 years. It begins to reproduce typically in late spring, and the female usually releases more than 100,000 eggs. After releasing and fertilizing their eggs, all parental care is ended.

Appearance and anatomy
The physical appearance of the river carpsucker is fairly distinctive. It is stout, with a somewhat compressed and arched back. The area around its dorsal fin is olive-brown before it fades to silver, with a white belly. In the young, the fins are usually opaque, while in the old, their fins are a dark yellow. The lower lip is projected in a similar fashion to a nipple at the midpoint, and big scales cover its whole body. It also has a distinctive 18 caudal fin rays.  The species is frequently confused with non-native species, such as the various Asian carp species.

Distribution
The river carpsucker has historically occupied the Mississippi River basin from Pennsylvania to Montana. It also currently occupies the Gulf Slope Drainage from the Calcasieu River to the Rio Grande in Texas, Louisiana, and New Mexico. It was introduced to Lake Erie and the lower Maumee River, Ohio. It was supposedly deliberately introduced with a shipment of buffalo fish as a game species, and they are currently used in sport fishing. The effects of its introduction have not been studied, so are not well known. However, failure to find more river carpsuckers in the lower Maumee River suggests this species never took hold in this area. In the spring, they migrate upstream as the water temperatures begin to rise, and then move back downstream after spawning.

Ecology
The river carpsucker is classified as a suction, or filter feeder, which means it typically eats algae and small planktonic animals and plants. They get their nutrients from filtering silt and detritus. As a bottom-feeder, it does not have very much competition, so its main worry is predation. It is typically preyed on by larger carnivorous fish such as northern pike, muskellunge, walleye, and largemouth bass, but only in its juvenile stage. Their largest predators are humans, although some larger birds, such as great blue herons, have been known to eat them. They can be found in large rivers and reservoirs, with sand or silt bottoms in slower-moving currents. The young typically are found in small streams, or tributaries. They are more abundant in areas with slower water velocity and moderate temperatures.

Lifecycle
During breeding season, small tubercles can be observed on the body of the male. Reproduction typically occurs during late spring, in large spawning groups. The female can spawn more than once per year, and usually releases more than 100,000 eggs. To spawn, the temperature of the water must be , and spawning ends around the beginning of summer when water temperatures begin to rise. They exhibit no parental care; instead, they broadcast their eggs onto the sand and then leave them. The lifespan of river carpsucker can span decades, much like other long-lived catostomids; longevity more than 45 years has been documented. They are schooling fish and will often be found in large groups.

Relationship with people
The river carpsucker currently has no established management plans, but is frequently caught by commercial fisherman for food, though they are not officially considered a game species. However, they are in large abundance in a few areas in their range. They are very plentiful in Elephant Butte Reservoir and Caballo Lake in New Mexico. They also can be affected by humans; their population begins reducing rapidly with the introduction of toxins into their habitat. The world record for the species stands at 13lb 4 oz caught in Cass County Nebraska in 1999.

References

river carpsucker
Freshwater fish of the United States
river carpsucker
river carpsucker